Richard Ellwood (born 6 April 1965) is a former English cricketer.  Ellwood was a right-handed batsman who bowled slow left-arm orthodox.  He was born in Penrith, Cumberland.

Ellwood made his debut for Cumberland in the 1984 Minor Counties Championship against Lincolnshire.  Ellwood played Minor counties cricket for Cumberland from 1984 to 2000, including 49 Minor Counties Championship matches and 11 MCCA Knockout Trophy matches.  In 1989, he made his List A debut against Lancashire in the NatWest Trophy.  He played three further List A matches for Cumberland, the last of which came against Worcestershire in the 1995 NatWest Trophy.  In his four List A matches, he scored 29 runs at a batting average of 29.00, with a high score of 24*.  With the ball he took 2 wickets at a bowling average of 59.00, with best figures of 2/49.  His 2 wickets came against Essex in the 1992 NatWest Trophy and were those of Test cricketers Graham Gooch and Mark Waugh.

He also played Second XI cricket for the Leicestershire Second XI, the Lancashire Second XI and the Essex Second XI.

References

External links
Richard Ellwood at ESPNcricinfo
Richard Ellwood at CricketArchive

1965 births
Living people
People from Penrith, Cumbria
English cricketers
Cumberland cricketers
Cricketers from Cumbria